SP5 may refer to :
 1982 SP5, an alternate name for 9915 Potanin, a C-type main belt asteroid
 1978 SP5, an alternate name for 15675 Goloseevo, a Main-belt Asteroid discovered on September 27, 1978
 SP5, a postcode in the SP postcode area
sp5, spinal trigeminal tract and nucleus
A civilian variant of the Heckler & Koch MP5  

SP-5 may refer to :
 USS Tacony (SP-5), an armed yacht that served in the United States Navy as a patrol vessel from 1917 to 1918
 one of the three versions of the 9x39 mm rifle cartridge
 Specialist Fifth Class, a rank in the United States Army
 a model of steam toy made by British manufacturer Mamod